Cardiooncology, cardio-oncology or cardiovascular oncology is an interdisciplinary field of medicine by which are studied the molecular and clinical alterations in cardiovascular system during the different methods of treatment of cancer, especially chemotherapy and targeted therapy.

Since 2018 the European Society of Cardiology has had a council of cardio-oncology.

References

Oncology
Cardiology
Interdisciplinary subfields of medicine